Evan Lewis (May 24, 1860 – November 3, 1919) was an American professional wrestler who was the first recognized American Heavyweight Champion and is credited with perfecting the "stranglehold" or "neck yoke" more commonly known today as the sleeperhold. He is sometimes confused with Ed "Strangler" Lewis, a later six-time World Heavyweight Champion also credited with first using the hold, whose moniker is attributed to Lewis's after a reporter noted a resemblance between the two.

Life and wrestling career
Born in Ridgeway, Wisconsin, of Welsh descent, Lewis began wrestling professionally winning a 64-man tournament in Montana in May 1882. He returned to Wisconsin and defeated Ben Knight for the Wisconsin Heavyweight Championship in a Mineral Point match on March 20, 1883. Moving to Madison in 1885, he later defeated several international wrestlers, including Andre Christol, Tom Cannon, and Matsuda Sorakichi.

Defeating Joe Acton in Chicago, Illinois, for the American Catch-as-Catch-can Championship on March 14, 1887, he later unified the World Catch-as-Catch-can and American Greco-Roman Heavyweight Championship in a best-of-five match against Ernest Roeber in New Orleans, Louisiana on March 3, 1893 (he also had defeated him for the "Collar and Elbow Championship" on May 18, 1890). After defending the title for over eight years, Lewis lost the American Heavyweight Championship to Martin Burns, whom he had previously defeated in his debut match in 1886.

In the 1880s he fought in Cornish wrestling challenge matches against various opponents. He lost a protracted series of matches in 1883 and 1884 against Jack Carkeek.

As with most wrestlers at this time, he fought in mixed style challenge matches for significant prizes. For example in 1892, in Chicago, he beat the Cornish wrestling champion Jack King in a 5 styles match (Greco-Roman, Catch as catch can, American side hold, Cornish and Collar-and-elbow) for $500.

Lewis died of cancer in Dodgeville, Wisconsin.

Championships and accomplishments
 Catch wrestling
 World Catch-as-Catch-Can Championship (1 time)
 American Catch-as-Catch-can Championship (1 time)
 Greco-Roman wrestling
 American Greco-Roman Heavyweight Championship (1 time)
International Professional Wrestling Hall of Fame
Class of 2021
 Professional wrestling
 American Heavyweight Championship (1 time)
 British World Heavyweight Championship (1 time)
 Wisconsin Heavyweight Championship (1 time)
Wrestling Observer Newsletter awards
Wrestling Observer Newsletter Hall of Fame (Class of 2007)
Professional Wrestling Hall of Fame and Museum
(Class of 2009)

References

External links
WAWLI Redux No. 37 - The Toughest Madisonian Who Ever Lived
Deceased Superstars: Evan Lewis

1860 births
1919 deaths
19th-century professional wrestlers
People from Ridgeway, Wisconsin
Sportspeople from Madison, Wisconsin
American catch wrestlers
American male professional wrestlers
Professional wrestlers from Wisconsin
Professional Wrestling Hall of Fame and Museum